The Dale Cemetery located in Ossining, New York is a town-owned rural cemetery encompassing  and has been operational since October 1851. In 2013 it was listed on the National Register of Historic Places.

Description
The Dale Cemetery located in Ossining, New York is a town-owned cemetery encompassing . The cemetery was originally owned by the Dale Cemetery Association which was incorporated on 16 January 1851 and was dedicated in October 1851.  It was designed by Howard Daniels.  At its dedication Professor C. Mason said, that we build cemeteries "for the use, the pleasure, the instruction, the edification of the living."  Its first President was Aaron Ward, retired congressman. The cemetery was acquired by the Town of Ossining in 2004.

Notable interments
 Thomas Allcock (1815–1891), Civil War General for the Union Army
 Franz Boas (1858–1942), the "Father of American Anthropology"
 Benjamin Brandreth (1807–1880), proprietor of Brandreth's Pills, one of the earliest mass market consumer branded products in the United States, founder of Brandreth Park
 Chester Hoff (1891–1998), Oldest ex-Major League Baseball player at time of death. He played for the NY Highlanders (later the NY Yankees) and St. Louis Browns.
 John Thompson Hoffman (1828–1888), governor of New York (1869–72), Mayor of New York City (1866–68)
 Edwin A. McAlpin (1848–1917), president of the D.H. McAlpin & Co tobacco company, builder of the Hotel McAlpin, the largest hotel in the world, and Adjutant General of the State of New York
 Sonny Sharrock (1940–1994), jazz guitarist
 Aaron Ward (1790–1867), American congressman
 Samuel Youngs (1760–1839), who in 1851 was moved from his earlier burial site and became the first person interred at Dale Cemetery. He was a possible inspiration for the character Ichabod Crane in his friend Washington Irving's story "The Legend of Sleepy Hollow".

See also
 National Register of Historic Places listings in northern Westchester County, New York

References

Cemeteries in Westchester County, New York
Cemeteries on the National Register of Historic Places in New York (state)
National Register of Historic Places in Westchester County, New York
1851 establishments in New York (state)
Ossining, New York
Rural cemeteries